In China, pornography which is defined as the People's Republic of China (PRC) or the Republic of China (ROC), may vary depending on governing authority. PRC criminal laws prohibit producing, disseminating, or selling sexually explicit material which the person doing so may be sentenced to life imprisonment. There is an ongoing campaign against "spiritual pollution", the term referencing the Chinese Communist party's Anti-Spiritual Pollution Campaign of 1983. Although pornography is illegal, it is available via the Internet. Nationwide surveys between the years 2000 and 2015 revealed "more than 70 percent of men aged 18 to 29 said they had watched porn in the past year."

PRC authorities have closed down many pornographic services in recent years, but an ongoing cat and mouse game between the two has led providers and users to find other ways to share adult content, both self-made and pirated from other pornographic film studios. In this aspect the development of the nation's online porn industry reflects the overall development of China's Internet.

In contrast, pornographic films can be legally traded in Taiwan and pornography is available via a number of routes, including DVD, television and the Internet. The level of piracy of pornographic films in the ROC territories is high because authorities have not traditionally recognised their copyrights. Copyright protection is usually strictly applied in the ROC, but pornography has been seen as an exception.

Legality 
According to the Section 9 of Criminal Law of the People's Republic of China, it is illegal to produce and distribute pornographic material for profit, violators shall be sentenced to fixed-term imprisonment of not more than three years, criminal detention or public surveillance and shall also be fined; simple possession is legal.

According to the Article 68 of Law of the PRC on Penalties for Administration of Public Security, it is illegal to produce, transport, duplicate, sell or lend pornographic materials including books, periodicals, pictures, movies and audio-video products, or disseminate pornographic information by making use of computer information networks, telephones or other means of communications, violators shall be detained for no less than 10 days but no more than 15 days and may, in addition, be fined no more than 3,000 yuan; and if the circumstances are relatively minor, they shall be detained for no more than 5 days or be fined no more than 500 yuan; simple possession is legal.

In mainland China, there are no laws that specifically distinguishing and punishing child pornography, the existing laws adopt a uniform standard of punishment for all pornography.

But in practice, it is limited to punishing violators who spread pornographic materials amounting to more than 40 files on China's social medias platforms., nobody was punished for leeching and seeding pornographic materials via P2P network, in contrast, many people get pornographic materials this way. Giant companies like Baidu, Tencent which provides Cloud storages and P2P offline download services (Seedbox) will change pornographic videos to "8 seconds educational videos" to educate users that the government is conducting a campaign to combat pornography and illegal activities or simply prevent users download or upload pornographic materials.

Government censorship 

In 1997, a sweeping wave of regulations aimed at restricting internet usage was enacted. Section Five of the Computer Information Network and Internet Security, Protection, and Management Regulations was the first time pornography was specifically targeted and banned in China's criminal law. It defined obscene material as any "books, periodicals, movies, video-and audio-tapes, pictures, etc. that explicitly portray sexual behavior or undisguisedly publicize pornographic materials", but made exception for those used for medical or artistic purposes.

The State Administration of Radio, Film and Television's prohibition on pornography has been complete, and the government has shown no signs of reversing its decision. Directors, producers, and actors involved in pornographic films have been barred from competing in any film competitions. Any film studio found in violation may have its license revoked.

Ideas 
Chinese government consistently holds the idea that pornography information is harmful, arguing that "disseminating pornographic information online severely harms the physical and mental health of minors, and seriously corrupts social ethos", pornography information is close to "spiritual pollution". Xinhuanet states that "Chinese cultural traditions and moral values do not allow obscene and pornographic information to spread unchecked on the Internet".

Methods 
The term Great Firewall of China was coined in 1997 by Geremie Barmé to describe the combination of legislative actions and technologies enforced by the People's Republic of China to regulate the Internet domestically. First introduced in 1997, three years after the internet first arrived in China, it included regulations prohibiting the use of the internet to disseminate sexually suggestive material, among other things. The Great Firewall is a subsystem of the Golden Shield Project, also referred to as the "National Public Security Work Informational Project".

In its effort to combat internet pornography and other internet activity which it deemed illegal, the government of China issued the widespread use of internet censors. Algorithms designed by tech companies including Alibaba and Tuputech, these censors were designed to detect, block, and remove all sexual content. The development of artificial intelligence technologies has been essential in the success of the censorship of internet pornography in China.

Issues 
Chinese internet censors are highly skilled at detecting pornographic images, audios, and videos. However, these censors are imperfect and susceptible to errors. An online lecture on human birth was shut down after censors flagged the livestream as pornographic material. “A livestreamed course on meiosis, the division of sex cells...” resulted in a similar problem for a biology teacher in Wenzhou, China. While trying to eliminate all sexual content, censors have inadvertently targeted educational content though the law allows it.

Pornography related charges often carry serious punishments. Distributors of pornography can face up to life imprisonment and possession charges carry hefty fines and can cary prison sentences. Some critics claim that censorship disproportionately targets LGBT content, which leads to higher criminalization of authors and creators who attempt to make pornography more inclusive. Others claim that the crackdown on pornography is used as a tool by the Communist Party to increase censorship and further limit freedom of expression.

Sex education is extremely limited in China. Consequently, pornography has become the "only source of information for millions of young people" looking to learn about sex.

Survival of pornography

Pornographic websites
The first pornographic websites appeared in China before sites like YouPorn and Pornhub became popular in the West. A few major (though ill-fated) websites appeared in China during 2004, including "99 Erotica Forum" and "Erotica Juneday". The business model for these websites requires visitors to navigate through pay-per-click advertisements for sex toys, Viagra-esque pills, and online casinos before they can watch or download pornographic content. The websites typically offer a mix of domestic amateur pornography videos and pirated content from Japan, Europe and the US. They typically set up their servers overseas and frequently change their URLs to avoid being detected by the authorities. The quantity of advertisements on these websites, sometimes with no pornographic content available after the advertisements have been navigated, and the high risk of picking up malware in the process of attempting to access these websites has prompted some services in China to charge a membership fee in return for greater reliability and fewer or no advertisements. However, the use of domestic bank accounts makes such websites even more vulnerable to authorities. The continued creation and distribution of pornography, despite its illegality, has resulted in the imprisonment of thousands of people across China.

Pornography related arrests and censorship

2004-2006 
A crackdown of pornographic websites in 2004 lead to the arrests of over 200 people and the shutdown of over 700 pornographic websites including "99 Erotica", after having acquired more than 300,000 registered users within a year of its launch. One of those imprisoned, Wang Yanli, was believed to be the first woman jailed on a pornography related charge. She received a sentence of four years for operating an online strip club.

In 2005 authorities sentenced its eleven workers, among them teachers and civil servants, to imprisonment ranging from three to twelve years for disseminating obscene material. In October 2006 authorities closed down "Erotica Juneday", which charged its highest-paying members 3,999 yuan (then around $490) a year, and sentenced founder Chen Hui to life imprisonment. Among those who complained about the harshness of the sentence was the sociologist Li Yinhe. She called on authorities to either repeal the pornography laws in China or stop pretending the nation enjoys freedom of expression.

2009-present 
Between 2009 and 2010, crackdowns on pornography sites resulted in the arrests of thousands of people annually. In 2009, 5,394 people were arrested and 9,000 illegal porn-related sites were shut down. In 2010, Chinese authorities shut down 60,000 pornographic websites and arrested almost 5,000 suspects.

Slang terms 
Pornography collectors who have resources are called "old drivers", while sharing pornographic videos is referred to as "driving", the recipient of the content is known as a "car seat" and pornography is "welfare".

See also

 Pornography laws by region
 Internet censorship in China
 Legality of child pornography
 Legal status of internet pornography

References

Ch
Laws of China
Chi